William G. Schenck (July 1854 – January 29, 1934) was a 19th-century Major League Baseball player. He played in 1882 and 1884–1885 for the Louisville Eclipse, Richmond Virginians and Brooklyn Grays of the American Association. The positions he played were Shortstop and Third Baseman.

References

External links
Baseball-Reference page
Baseball Almanac

19th-century baseball players
Baseball players from New York (state)
Sportspeople from Brooklyn
Baseball players from New York City
Major League Baseball third basemen
Major League Baseball shortstops
Brooklyn Grays players
Louisville Eclipse players
Richmond Virginians players
Brooklyn Chelsea players
Utica Pent Ups players
Nationals of Washington players
Washington Nationals (minor league) players
Albany (minor league baseball) players
Brooklyn Atlantics (minor league) players
Brooklyn Grays (Interstate Association) players
Richmond Virginians (minor league) players
Springfield (minor league baseball) players
Trenton Trentonians players
Long Island A's players
1854 births
1934 deaths
Burials at Cypress Hills Cemetery